National Ukrainian Academy of Arts is a state scientific and artistic institution in the field of art, culture, and art history in Ukraine. The academy is one of the six state funded institutions along with the National Academy of Sciences of Ukraine that was established in 1996 and obtained its National status in 2010. The membership to the academy is on an electoral basis for the distinguished specialists of professional artistry: theater and film directors, composers, painters, conductors, actors etc.

History

Origin 
The work of Kyiv-Mohyla and Ostroh Academies had a strong influence on the development of Ukrainian Arts in the 16th and 17th centuries. Theatrical performances, dramas, and music concerts performed by students with other important events have taken place in the aforementioned academies on the eve of holidays and festivals. In general, the foundation of academies in Ukraine is historically connected with the growth of the cultural level of Ukrainian society and with essential changes in the development of the education of artists. Increasing the possibilities for development of talented youth’s creativity and carrying out complex, scientific research lies at the base of academics.

First academy (1918)
On the 18th of December 1917, the Ukrainian State Academy of Arts (nowadays The National Academy of Fine Arts and Architecture), was founded. The founding of the Academy, one of the highest level art education centers in Europe, and its further development in the history of Ukrainian culture was a remarkable event in the life of Ukrainian Art and is regarded as continuing glamorous Ukrainian traditions in Art and the realization of nation’s cultural needs and desires. In 1922, the Academy was reorganized and renamed the Institution of Plastic Arts. In 1924 it was renamed as the Kyiv Fine Arts Institute.

After liquidation
The creative potential of the outstanding masters of Ukrainian culture required further development. So the idea of founding an Academy of a scientific-creative type appeared in the 1920s. From 1927 to 1928, on behalf of the government, the presidium of the Ukrainian Academy of Science formed a special committee headed by AS academician of Ukraine O. P. Novytskyy. The committee prepared special documents so that the Ukrainian Academy of Arts could be established. Afterwards, due to repressions of artistic intelligentsia, of which a number of art critics, for example F. L. Ernst, M. F. Bilyashyvskyy, D. M. Scherbakivskyy, M. O. Makarenko and others were subjected, the foundation of the Academy was postponed. In 1941 at the request of artistic intelligentsia the Ukrainian authorities resumed planning for the Academy’s foundation, but this time the Second World War was the obstacle.

Right after the war a range of scientific research institutions for building-architectural and artistic profile were opened in Ukraine within the Academy of Architecture (in 1956 it was reorganized into the URSS Academy of Architecture and Building and it was liquidated in 1964). The Institution on the Theory and History of Architecture, the Institution of Monumental Painting and Sculpture, and the Institution of Artistic Industry were among them. Scientific Research departments on the theory and history of Art, post graduate education, workshops for art critics, artists and architects were contained in the structure of these establishments. The masters of Art and Architecture P. O. Biletskyy, H. N. Lohvyn, V. H. Zabolotnyy, P. M. Zholtovskyy, O. S. Shovkunenko carried out theoretical and practical work there.

Numerous fundamental works on the History of Art and Architecture were published during those days, including “The History of the Ukrainian Art” in six volumes. In 1960 many of the scientific research institutions within the Academy of Architecture and Building were liquidated while others were distributed into different departments. Haphazard reorganization and eradication of the Ukrainian Art School in the years of repression destroyed a rich inheritance of traditions and ideas. From 1970s to 1980s, the art community brought up the question a number of times of founding the Academy and its corresponding institutions. At last the idea of organizing the State Scientific Research Institution was approved by the Ukrainian government and was fulfilled on December 14, 1996.

Members
The Academy unites members (academicians), correspondent-members, honored and foreign members in the field of Fine Art and decorative art, architecture, design, music, theatre, cinema, choreography, art criticism, museum etc. Members and correspondent members of The Ukrainian Academy of Arts are elected at department assemblies and general assemblies.

Many members of the Ukrainian Academy of Arts have been honored by state awards. There are seven Heroes of Ukraine, thirty-three laureates of the T. Shevchenko National Award and four laureates of The State Scientific-Technical Award of Ukraine in the staff of the Academy. Twenty five members have a degree of Doctor and sixty three have the title of Professor. Among foreign members (academicians) of Ukrainian Academy of Arts are cinema director Jerzy Hoffman (Poland), art critic V. D. Revutskyy (Canada) and painter-photographer A. P. Solomoukha (France).

Honored members include, art critic, pedagogue L. P. Zapasko, architect A. H. Ihnaschenko, composers A. S. Karamanov, L. Kolodub choirmaster P. I. M Muravskyy, builder and social worker O. O. Omelchenko, scientist V. P. Semynozhenko, researcher and pedagogue I. M. Sedak (Ukraine), film producer A. L. Zharovskyy, (Germany), sculptor Frank Meisler (Israel) and others.

Departments and institutes

Departments
Department of Visual Arts
Department of Music Arts
Department of Theatric Arts
Department of Cinematic Arts
Department of Theory and History of Arts
Department of Plastic Arts Synthesis

Institutes
 Modern Arts Research Institute
 Institute of Culturology

See also
 Victor Sydorenko
 Pavlo Makov

External links
Official National Academy of Arts of Ukraine website
Encyclopedia of Ukraine.com: Ukrainian State Academy of Arts

References

 
Arts in Ukraine
Ukraine
Ukraine
Research institutes in Ukraine
Education in Kyiv
Shevchenkivskyi District, Kyiv
Arts
Arts organizations established in 1996
1996 establishments in Ukraine
Ukrainian art
Institutions with the title of National in Ukraine